Milán is a small town and municipality in Caquetá Department, Colombia.

References

Municipalities of Caquetá Department